The Circuito (Parco) Palermo  (commonly known as the Palermo Circuit), was a Grand Prix circuit in Buenos Aires (Argentina). The  circuit used a layout of public roads within the north-end of the Palermo park complex (adjacent to the Hipodromo Argentino), to host the Buenos Aires Grand Prix from 1948 to 1950.

Palermo was the site of the General Juan Perón / Eva Duarte de Perón Grand Prix series, hosting five (of twelve) alternating editions (The first was held at the Retiro circuit in 1947).

Buenos Aires Grand Prix 1948–1950

References

 
Sport in Buenos Aires
Palermo
Defunct motorsport venues